This is a list of Estonian television related events from 1969.

Events

Debuts

Television shows

Ending this year

Births
1 May - Hannes Võrno, actor, comedian, and TV host
19 June - Marko Reikop, TV host
23 November - Üllar Saaremäe, actor

Deaths